Megachile palmeri is a species of bee in the family Megachilidae. It was described by Cresson in 1878.

References

Palmeri
Insects described in 1878